Gorenje Grčevje is a small settlement in the hills north of Novo Mesto in southeastern Slovenia. The entire City Municipality of Novo Mesto is part of the traditional region of Lower Carniola and is now included in the Southeast Slovenia Statistical Region.

References

External links
Gorenje Grčevje on Geopedia

Populated places in the City Municipality of Novo Mesto